Jacob von der Lippe (27 September 1797–2 October 1878) was a Norwegian politician and priest who served as Bishop  of the Diocese of Christianssand from 1841 to 1875.  He was also a member of the Parliament of Norway for a total of eight non-consecutive parliamentary terms from 1829 until 1861.

Education
Jacob von der Lippe was born in Bergen, Norway on 27 September 1797 into a merchant family. After graduating with an Examen artium certificate in 1818, he went on to study theology at the Royal Frederick University in Christiania where he received a Cand.theol. degree in 1819.

Career

Priest
His first job after the university was as a curate in Haus, just outside of the city of Bergen in Western Norway.  In 1821, he was given the job of parish priest in Skånevik in the far southern part of Hordaland county.  He held this job until 1825 when he was transferred to the parish of Avaldsnes on the island of Karmøy, just outside of Haugesund.  In 1829, he was elected to be the Dean of the Karmsund prosti (deanery) in northern Rogaland county.  In 1831, von der Lippe was elected to be the stiftsprost in Kristiansand, one of the highest ranking priests in the Diocese of Christianssand.  During this time, he served as the acting Bishop twice.  In 1841, the King appointed him to be the Bishop of the diocese.  He held that post until his retirement in 1875. He was succeeded by Jørgen Moe as bishop.

During his time as Bishop, he was characterized as fairly conservative in his beliefs, and he was also thought of as fairly authoritarian.  An old story about von der Lippe says that a farmer had met with the bishop, and afterwards exclaimed "" which means "That is the biggest dictator I have ever met!".

Politician
He was first elected to the Parliament of Norway in the 1829 Storting election while serving as dean in Avaldsnes.  When he moved to Christianssand, he was steadily re-elected to represent that city in the 1832 Storting election, the 1835 Storting election, the 1838 Storting election, and the 1841 Storting election.  He declined re-election in 1845, but he did get re-elected in the 1847 Storting election.  Again in 1850, he declined to run, but in the 1853 election he was elected again to represent Christianssand.  He again decided not to run for re-election in 1857, but two years later in the 1859 Storting election he was elected for his final term in office.

When the municipal government law was implemented in 1838 (see formannskapsdistrikt law), he was elected to the municipal council for the city of Christianssand, a position that he held until 1840.

Personal life
Jacob von der Lippe was born in Bergen, Norway, on 27 September 1797 to parents Gerhard von der Lippe (1776–1830) and Antonette Ulriche Dietrichson (1770–1801).  He was married on 5 July 1820 Ingeborg Erichsen (1800–1880).  He is the great-grandfather to Frits von der Lippe and Jens von der Lippe.  He died on 2 October 1878 in the city of Kristiansand, Norway, at the age of 81.

References

1797 births
1878 deaths
Clergy from Bergen
Bishops of Agder og Telemark
19th-century Lutheran bishops
Politicians from Bergen
Politicians from Kristiansand
Members of the Storting